𓈖 (U+13216, Gardiner N35) is the Egyptian "water ripple" hieroglyph. See:
List of Egyptian hieroglyphs#N for its list entry
Egyptian unilateral signs for its role as phonetic sign for n
Egyptian_language#Prepositions for its role as preposition
M#History for its role as historical origin of the letter M

See also
Nu (god of primeval waters)
Deshret (alternative n sign)
Gardiner's Sign List

N35